Zahrensdorf is a former municipality  in the Ludwigslust-Parchim district, in Mecklenburg-Vorpommern, Germany. Since 1 January 2016 it is part of the new municipality Kloster Tempzin.

References

Ludwigslust-Parchim
Former municipalities in Mecklenburg-Western Pomerania